Dato' Sri Haji Mohammad Najib bin Tun Haji Abdul Razak (born 23 July 1953) is a Malaysian politician who served as the 6th prime minister of Malaysia from April 2009 to May 2018. In 2020, he was convicted of corruption in the 1Malaysia Development Berhad scandal, one of the largest money-laundering scandals in history. He is the son of former prime minister Abdul Razak Hussein. Najib Razak was the chairman of the Barisan Nasional (BN) coalition from April 2009 to May 2018 and the president of the United Malays National Organisation (UMNO) from November 2008 to May 2018, which had maintained control of Malaysia's government with a parliamentary majority for more than sixty years until the coalition's defeat in the 2018 general election.

Najib was elected to the Parliament of Malaysia in 1976, at the age of 23, replacing his deceased father in the Pahang-based seat of Pekan. In the same year, he was appointed the head of UMNO Youth's Pekan branch and became a member of the youth wing's Executive Council. In the early years of his political career, Najib took on a deputy minister role in 1976, and between 1982 and 1986, he was the Menteri Besar of Pahang. Thereafter, until 2009, he was rotated throughout the Cabinet of Malaysia, taking on various ministerial portfolios in defence, education, culture, youth and sports, and finally finance. Between 1993 and 2009, Najib was a vice-president of UMNO.

Najib's tenure as prime minister, between 2009 and 2018, was marked by economic liberalisation measures, such as cuts to government subsidies, loosening of restrictions on foreign investment, and reductions in preferential measures for ethnic Malays in business. After the 2013 election, his government pursued a number of its critics on sedition charges, the imprisonment of opposition leader Anwar Ibrahim following a conviction for sodomy and the implementation of a Goods and Services Tax (GST). He also led the country through the Malaysia Airlines Flight 370 disaster and a dispute with North Korea following the assassination of Kim Jong-nam. In 2015, Najib became implicated in a major corruption scandal involving state investment firm 1Malaysia Development Berhad (1MDB) which led to rallies calling for his resignation, spearheaded by the grassroots movement Bersih. These protests culminated in the Malaysian Citizens' Declaration by Mahathir Mohamad, Pakatan Harapan and NGOs which sought to oust Najib.

Najib's response to the corruption accusations was to tighten his grip on power by replacing then-deputy prime minister Muhyiddin Yassin, suspending two newspapers and pushing through parliament a controversial National Security Council Bill that provides the prime minister with unprecedented powers. Najib's various subsidy cuts have contributed to soaring living costs, while fluctuating oil prices and the fallout from the 1MDB scandal led to a depreciation of the Malaysian currency. These ended with BN's loss in the 2018 general elections, the results of which Najib then accepted and promised to help facilitate a smooth transition of power.

On 3 July 2018, Najib was arrested by the Malaysian Anti-Corruption Commission (MACC), which investigated how RM42 million (US$10.6 million) went from SRC International, a company related to 1MDB, into Najib's bank account. In the process, the police seized a number of fashion accessories worth $273 million while searching through his properties. Najib was subsequently charged and convicted by the High Court on abuse of power, money laundering and criminal breach of trust, becoming the first Prime Minister of Malaysia to be convicted of corruption, and was sentenced to 12 years' imprisonment and fined RM210 million. The sentence was upheld by the Federal Court on 23 August 2022. He is currently serving his sentence in Kajang Prison.

Early life and education
Najib was born on 23 July 1953 at the Pahang State Secretary official residence in Bukit Bius, Kuala Lipis, Pahang. Najib is the eldest of second Malaysian Prime Minister Abdul Razak's six sons, and the nephew of the third PM Hussein Onn. His younger brother, Dato' Seri Mohd Nazir Abdul Razak, runs the country's second-largest lender, Bumiputra-Commerce Holdings Bhd. Najib is also one of the Four Noblemen of the Pahang Darul Makmur (Royal Court) by virtue of his inherited title as the Orang Kaya Indera Shahbandar. He received his primary and secondary education at St. John's Institution, Kuala Lumpur. He later attended Malvern College in Worcestershire, England, and subsequently went to the University of Nottingham, where he received a bachelor's degree in industrial economics in 1974. Najib Razak returned to Malaysia in 1974 and entered the business world, serving briefly in Bank Negara Malaysia and later with Petronas (Malaysia's national oil company) as a public affairs manager.

Early political career
The eldest son of Malaysian Prime Minister, Abdul Razak Hussein, was elected to the Parliament of Malaysia in 1976 replacing his deceased father in the Pahang-based seat of Pekan. The national outpouring of grief following Tun Razak's death and the respect for his father helped Najib win election unopposed as Member of Parliament at the very young age of 23. In 1986 Najib won re-election to the same seat.

From 1982 to 1986 he was the Menteri Besar (Chief Minister) of Pahang, before holding various cabinet posts throughout the remainder of the 1980s and 1990s, including Defence and Education.  In 2004 he became Deputy Prime Minister  under Prime Minister Abdullah Ahmad Badawi, and replaced him 2009. Under his leadership, Barisan Nasional won the 2013 elections, although for the first time in Malaysia's history the opposition won the majority of the popular vote.

Najib was first assigned into the Cabinet of Malaysia at the age of 25 when he was appointed Deputy Minister of Energy, Telecommunications and Post in 1978, becoming the youngest deputy minister in the country. He served as the Menteri Besar (Chief Minister) of Pahang between 1982 and 1986, becoming the youngest Menteri Besar in the state to enter office when he was sworn in at the age of 29. In 1986 he was appointed as Minister of Culture, Youth and Sports in the Cabinet of Mahathir Mohamad. He focused on improving Malaysian sports and introduced the National Sports Policy in 1988. In 1989 Malaysia achieved its best-ever performance at the South East Asia (SEA) Games, held in Kuala Lumpur.
Najib was appointed head of UMNO Youth's Pekan branch and became a member of UMNO Youth's Executive Council (Exco) in 1976. In 1981, he was selected as a member of UMNO's Supreme Council, before winning the post of Vice-President of UMNO Youth in 1982.

On 26 October 1987, the then leader of the opposition, Lim Kit Siang, called for the Anti-Corruption Agency to investigate how Najib, who was then Pahang MB, could give approval for a logging concession of 2000 acres to a resident of a low-cost housing estate. He asked ACA to investigate whether the logging concessionnaire was in fact a nominee for Najib himself.

In 1987, Najib was selected as the acting head of the Movement of UMNO Youth by Dato' Seri Anwar Ibrahim after Anwar was asked to contest the post of UMNO Vice-President. Following mounting ethnic tensions anti-Chinese sentiments were expressed at a UMNO Youth rally held in Kampung Baru, Kuala Lumpur the same year where Najib spoke. Rising tensions soon lead to fears of ethnic violence and eventually resulted in a security operation known as Operasi Lalang, that included numerous administrative detentions.

Following the complete reorganisation and founding of the "New" UMNO by Tun Dr. Mahathir Mohamad in the aftermath of the 1988 Malaysian constitutional crisis, Najib was appointed president of UMNO Youth in 1988.

By 1993, Najib was elected as one of six vice-presidents of UMNO in response to Anwar's decision to contest as the deputy president of UMNO. Najib continued to defend his post in party elections held in 1993, 1996, and 2004.

Senior Ministerial career

Minister for Defence (1991–1995)
In 1991, Mahathir appointed Najib as Minister of Defence. Under Najib's direction, Malaysian troops were deployed to assist the UN peacekeeping forces in Bosnia in 1993 during the Bosnian War. Malaysian forces were greeted warmly by Bosnians as well as Serbs and Croats. Malaysia also assisted peacekeeping operations in Somalia in 1993, losing one soldier in an effort to aid US soldiers during the Battle of Mogadishu. Najib later criticised the UN's Somalia operation as putting too much emphasis on military action. Since then Malaysia has stated a preference for participating in Chapter 6 "peace enforcement" missions, rather than Chapter 7 "peacekeeping" missions. After four years at the Ministry of Defence, Najib assumed control of the Education Ministry in 1995. He returned to the Ministry of Defence in 2000.

Minister for Education (1995–2000)

In 1995, Najib left the Defence Ministry for the first time when he was appointed Minister of Education. His challenge was to respond to Malaysia's newly proclaimed aspiration to become a fully developed nation by 2020. During his five-year tenure, Najib restructured the Ministry, created an independent corporate structure for public universities, and encouraged collaboration with foreign universities and institutions. The 1996 Private Higher Education Institutions Act, allowed foreign universities to establish degree-conferring schools in Malaysia, providing greater educational opportunities for Malaysians and positioning Malaysia as a regional learning hub. Najib also upgraded teaching certificates to the status of diplomas, so that teachers in that category would receive a higher monthly starting salary.

During the 1999 general elections Najib suffered a major setback when he barely won re-election to the Parliament by a margin of 241 votes, compared to a margin of over 10,000 in the previous election. Although a surprise to political observers, it was understandable given the political upheavals of 1999.

Return as Minister for Defence (2000–2008)

During his second tenure as Minister of Defence Najib coordinated Malaysia's relief efforts following the Indian Ocean tsunami of 2004, and provided support to Indonesia in arresting those responsible for the 2005 Bali bombings. Najib also oversaw the deployment of Malaysian troops as a part of a UN peacekeeping force in 2006, when Malaysia volunteered to help stabilise Lebanon following the 2006 Lebanon War.

As Defence Minister, Najib instituted compulsory military service in December 2003, stating that it would encourage interaction and friendship between youth of different ethnic groups and religions. During its first five years of operation, over 339,000 Malaysian youth participated in the PLKN (the Bahasa Malaysian acronym for "Malaysian National Service"), which is intended to promote tolerance, teamwork, and community engagement. The programme, however, has faced challenges.  Safety issues in the program have been reported and several people died during or shortly after their terms of service during the program's first few years. In response, Najib strengthened the PLKN's health screening requirements and reinforced the government's commitment to punish negligent PLKN officials.

The Altantuyaa affair 

French courts investigated allegations of corruption in the purchases of two  submarines, by the Malaysian Ministry of Defence in 2002, at a time when Najib was the minister of defence. The allegations are that Abdul Razak Baginda, an aide of Najib, received "commission" payments from the French submarine builder DCNS. Shaariibuugiin Altantuyaa, a Mongolian woman hired as a French translator to facilitate the purchase of the submarines and mistress to Baginda, tried to blackmail Baginda for a $500,000 cut and was subsequently murdered. 2 policemen, who were bodyguards posted to Najib, were charged and found guilty.

Deputy Prime Minister (2004–2009)
In 2004, Mahathir retired and was replaced by his deputy, Abdullah Ahmad Badawi. Najib became Deputy Prime Minister and was given a broad portfolio of responsibilities, including oversight of FELDA, the Human Rights Commission (SUHAKAM), and the Election Commission (EC). Najib also chaired more than 28 cabinet committees. He remained as Minister for Defence.

In September 2008, Najib became the Minister for Finance, handing the Defence portfolio to Badawi. During the global financial crisis, Malaysia faced a strong recession and reduced levels of trade throughout the South Asian region.  In response, Najib announced a series of stimulus packages to be implemented over a two-year period with the intention of acting as a countercyclical response that might otherwise protect Malaysia's economy.  He also pressed for the country to move beyond existing manufacturing capabilities through education, research and development to develop greater strength as a provider of sophisticated business services.

Becoming Prime Minister
After a poor showing by the ruling UMNO coalition in the elections of 8 March 2008 in which opposition parties gained control of five of thirteen Malaysian state governments, Badawi identified Najib as his intended successor. On 8 October 2008, Prime Minister Badawi announced he would step down in March 2009, paving the way for Najib to succeed him. However he said the onus was on Najib to win party elections set for March before he could take over. Najib ran for the presidency of UMNO and went on to win on 2 November 2008, without contest.

On 26 March 2009, Najib won the UMNO presidency unopposed. He was sworn in as Prime Minister of Malaysia on 3 April 2009 In 2012, Najib also assumed the role of women, family and community development minister, a position he held until the 2013 election.

Prime Minister

Najib entered office as Prime Minister with a focus on domestic economic issues and political reform. On his first day as Prime Minister, Najib announced as his first actions the removal of bans on two opposition newspapers, Suara Keadilan and Harakahdaily, run by the People's Justice Party and the Pan Islamic Party, respectively, and the release of 13 people held under the Internal Security Act. Among the released detainees were two ethnic Indian activists who were arrested in December 2007 for leading an anti-government campaign, three foreigners and eight suspected Islamic militants. Najib also pledged to conduct a comprehensive review of the much-criticised law which allows for indefinite detention without trial. In the speech, he emphasised his commitment to tackling poverty, restructuring Malaysian society, expanding access to quality education for all, and promoting renewed "passion for public service". He also deferred and abandoned the digital television transition plan of all free-to-air broadcasters such as Radio Televisyen Malaysia.

Domestic policy

1Malaysia

1Malaysia is an ongoing campaign announced by Prime Minister Najib Razak on 16 September 2008, calling for the cabinet, government agencies, and civil servants to emphasise ethnic harmony, national unity, and efficient governance. The eight values of 1Malaysia as articulated by Najib Razak are perseverance, a culture of excellence, acceptance, loyalty, education, humility, integrity, and meritocracy.

On 17 September 2008, Najib launched 1Malaysia.com.my in an effort to communicate with the citizens of Malaysia more efficiently and support the broader 1Malaysia campaign. He has used the site to highlight his policy initiatives and to provide a forum for Malaysians to their government. The 1Malaysia campaign makes extensive use of social media platforms such as Facebook and Twitter. Research has suggested that Najib and UMNO have made extensive efforts to establish a favourable online presence through the recruitment and support of bloggers and other social media users, sometimes known as 'cybertroopers.'

In June 2009 Najib overturned a rule that required 30% Malay ownership in corporations, and allowed non-ethnic Malays, like the Chinese and the Indians to exercise more financial control in Malaysia. Najib has also worked to improve relations with Singapore, which is seen by many as Chinese-dominated, to encourage it to invest more heavily in the Malaysian economy.

However, Najib has been criticised for an apparent deterioration of race relations in Malaysia during his tenure that has occurred despite the 1Malaysia programme. In 2014, the long-serving former Prime Minister Mahathir Mohamad withdrew his support for Najib citing, among other things, the abandonment by Chinese voters of the Barisan Nasional coalition. Najib's tenure has also been marked by increasingly aggressive racial rhetoric from elements within Najib's UMNO party, particularly towards Chinese Malaysians.

BR1M Project
The first BR1M Project was a scheme devised by Najib Razak to help poor Malaysians. The amount of RM 500.00 Ringgit Malaysia was given to households with an income of less than RM 3,000 a month.

The second BR1M Project, also known as BR1M 2.0, with more than 2.5 billion ringgit will be distributed to Malaysians nationwide. This will affect 5.7 million household all over the country. In addition to the RM 500.00 for household, the government has also allocated RM 250.00 to single individuals. Those who have received RM 500.00 from the first BR1M project need not apply as it will be automatically processed.

BR1M 4.0, which was announced in 2014, saw an increase in handouts from RM 650 to RM 950 for individuals earning less than RM 2,000.00, while households earning less than RM 4,000 will receive RM 750.

Housing Programme

Perumahan Rakyat 1Malaysia (PR1MA) Berhad was established under the PR1MA Act 2012 to plan, develop, construct and maintain affordable lifestyle housing for middle-income households in key urban centres. Middle-income is defined as a monthly household (husband and wife) income of between RM 2,500 and RM 7,500.

PR1MA will be the first organisation that exclusively targets this middle segment with homes ranging from RM 100,000 to RM 400,000 in a sustainable community.

National Security Council Bill 2015

In December 2015, the National Security Council Bill 2015 was passed in Parliament after a marathon six-hour debate. The bill provides the Prime Minister of Malaysia with unprecedented powers, such as the ability to define what constitutes a security issue as well as deem any part of Malaysia a security area. Within that area, authorities may make arrests, conduct searches or seize property without a warrant. The bill was criticised by rights groups as inviting government abuse. The Malaysian Bar called it a "lurch towards an authoritarian government". The government has defended the bill, with cabinet minister Shahidan Kassim saying the law is necessary to enable better co-ordination and a uniform response in the event the country is faced with security threats, and that the law does not contravene the basic human rights guaranteed under the federal constitution.

Economic policy

New Economic Model

On 2 May 2009, Prime Minister Najib Tun Razak announced the government's plan to develop a New Economic Model that will speed Malaysia's transition to a high-income country. The plan will emphasise ways to increase the income and productivity of workers by encouraging knowledge industries and increasing investment from overseas.

Reform of government subsidies

Najib has started to implement comprehensive reform of government subsidies. On 16 July 2010, subsidies for petrol, diesel and LPG were cut as part of Malaysia's general programme of reducing and rationalising subsidies per the 10th Malaysia Plan and the New Economic Model. The government believes it will save RM 750 million by the end of 2010 through these measures with little negative impact on most citizens. Sugar and fuel subsidies were selected for reform because they disproportionately benefit the wealthy and foreigners, encourage over-consumption and create opportunities for fraud and smuggling. The Prime Minister expressed his hope that Malaysians would adopt a healthier lifestyle. He said, "there is no logic in the government allocating subsidies worth almost RM1 billion on a commodity that could endanger the people's health". Responding to concerns about how these reforms might affect the poor, the Prime Minister's Office pointed out that Malaysia will still be spending RM 7.82 billion per year on fuel and sugar subsidies and that prices for these commodities would remain the lowest in Southeast Asia. The government also stated that education and health care would continue receiving state support.

Economic liberalisation
Malaysia has implemented substantial measures to attract foreign investment including a moderation of preferences designed to benefit ethnic Malays. Specifically these reforms include allowing foreign investors to hold majority stakes in most enterprises excluding "strategic" industries such as banking, telecommunications, and energy, easing insurance regulation, curtailing powers of the Foreign Investment Committee and lowering the minimum quota for Malay ownership in publicly traded companies from 30 percent to 12.5 percent. As he introduced the reforms Najib stated, "The world is changing quickly and we must be ready to change with it or risk being left behind."

Since these reforms have been implemented, the American banking firms Goldman Sachs and Citigroup have been granted permission to expand their operations in Malaysia. Goldman Sachs received licenses to set up fund management and advisory operations.  Citigroup has obtained a permit to offer brokerage services. The approval of these licenses is a sharp break from Malaysia's history of domestically dominated and tightly regulated markets for financial services.

The International Institute for Management Development responded to these and other reforms by increasing Malaysia's ranking to the 10th-most competitive economy in the world in 2010 from 18th in 2009. Malaysia, which is now ranked fifth in the Asia Pacific region, scored well in business and government efficiency. Economists attributed the rise of Malaysia's ranking to the efforts of the Malaysian government to improve the country's business environment such as the New Economic Model, the Government Transformation Programme and the Economic Transformation Programme.

Stimulus packages
The Malaysian government passed two stimulus packages to mitigate the effects of the global economic downturn.  The first stimulus package, worth RM 7 billion, was announced on 4 November 2008. The second package, worth RM 60 billion, was announced on 10 March 2009.  Since assuming office as Prime Minister, Najib has been monitoring the progress of the stimulus packages on a weekly basis. Government economists believe that the stimulus packages have successfully generated increased economic activity, especially in the construction sector. Malaysia's central bank reported that Malaysia's economy grew at an annualised rate of 9.5% during the first half of 2010. Prime Minister Najib says the country is on track to meet the 6% average annual growth to reach its goal of becoming a developed country by 2020. Commenting on this same economic data Najib said that as of August 2010 there were no plans for further economic stimulus. Rather he said the government would focus on improving Malaysia's economic fundamentals and increasing investment.

Foreign policy and state visits

Palestine

The government of Malaysia has long been a strong supporter of the Palestinian cause against the Israeli occupation of the West Bank. Malaysia also supports unity between the Palestinian Fatah and Hamas factions. Najib visited the West Bank with his wife Rosmah Mansor, escorted by senior officers of the Malaysian government. Najib Razak became the first Muslim leader from South East Asia to set foot on Palestinian soil. Najib says Palestinians can count on Malaysia, but for there to be lasting peace, Hamas and Fatah must unite to safeguard the safety and security of the Palestinian people. Malaysia will give Palestine the moral, financial and political support it needs to rise above its struggles, but securing a future of lasting peace hinges on the Palestinians being united. Najib Razak also stated that for Palestine to move towards having a future it envisioned, Palestinians would have to take the first step – to unite among themselves.

United States

Prime Minister Najib Razak's visit in September 2017 to the United States on the invitation of President Donald Trump successfully strengthened the Comprehensive Partnership that was established between Malaysia and the United States in 2014.

Najib enjoyed a close personal relationship with then US President Barack Obama and managed to upgrade Malaysia-US relations to a ‘comprehensive partnership’ in contrast to the strained relationship between both countries under the rule of former Prime Minister Dr. Mahathir bin Mohamad, who was critical of the United States.

Prime Minister Najib and President Barack Obama met just before the Nuclear Security Summit in Washington on 12 April 2010. This was their first one-on-one meeting. During their talk, Obama sought further assistance from Malaysia in stemming nuclear proliferation which Obama described as the greatest threat to world security. During the summit, Najib stressed that Malaysia only supported nuclear programmes designed for peaceful purposes. Najib's attendance at the summit was part of a week-long official visit to the United States.

India

Prime Minister Najib travelled to India on a five-day state visit in January 2010. His 200-strong entourage included cabinet ministers, deputy ministers, state government officials, members of parliament, and prominent business leaders. During his visit, Najib pushed for a free-trade agreement and co-operation across a wide range of fields. Najib and Indian Prime Minister Manmohan Singh signed an extradition treaty and agreements to co-operate in the areas of higher education and finance. The two countries agreed to sign a free-trade agreement before the end of 2010 and Najib called for signing a "Comprehensive Economic Cooperation Agreement" by the same date. These economic agreements have resulted in plans for RM 1.6 trillion in investment for Malaysia. In January 2010, Najib announced plans to develop a new visa regime for Indian nationals, specifically for managers and knowledge workers to visit Malaysia.

Singapore

Najib made a two-day visit to Singapore, on 21–22 May 2009. During the visit, both Najib and Singapore Prime Minister Lee Hsien Loong agreed to move bilateral relations forward in a more productive manner and will either set aside or resolve the "legacy" problems between the two countries. During a speech in Singapore, Najib said he hoped his visit would signal "the beginning of a new era" between the two countries.

in 2010 Najib resolved a key diplomatic problem between the two countries by ending the impasse over transportation links and Singaporean investment in Iskandar Malaysia. Prime Minister Najib and Lee Hsien Loong, Prime Minister of Singapore, have agreed to modify the Points of Agreement signed in 1990. Specifically, the two sides have promised to move the KTM railway station from Tanjung Pagar to Woodlands, set up a joint venture to be called M-S Pte Ltd to develop Marina One, and DUO in Bugis but the railway tracks were replaced by the "Green Corridor", develop a rapid transit and high-speed rail links, and allow Temasek and Khazanah to set up a joint venture for the purpose of developing a town in Iskandar Malaysia.

South Korea

Najib attended the ASEAN-South Korea Summit on 1 June 2009 hosted by South Korean President Lee Myung Bak.  During the summit, the ASEAN-Korea Investment Agreement was signed to boost economic and trade relations between ASEAN and South Korea After the summit, Najib said Malaysia is keen on emulating South Korea in developing a small-scale nuclear reactor for power generation, as well as South Korea's other low-carbon green technology.

China

Najib made a four-day visit to China on 2–5 June 2009. During the visit, Najib mentioned his family's special relationship with China, noting that his father, and Malaysia's second Prime Minister, first established diplomatic relations with China in 1974. During the visit, several substantive issues were discussed in meetings between Najib and Chinese President Hu Jintao and Chinese Premier Wen Jiabao. The two sides signed an endorsed strategic action plan covering 13 major areas, which will serve as the guideline for relations between Malaysia and China.  Najib described the trip as most fruitful. Najib also received an honorary doctorate in international relations from the Beijing Foreign Studies University.

Indonesia

Najib made a visit to Indonesia on 22–24 April 2009. Several issues were discussed, including co-operation in the tourism, oil and gas, and high-technology industries, as well as electricity supply from the Bakun dam to Kalimantan. Najib and his entourage also attended an official dinner hosted by Indonesian President Susilo Bambang Yudhoyono and his wife Ani Yudhoyono.

New Zealand

Under Najib's government, Malaysia signed a free-trade agreement (FTA) with New Zealand on 26 October 2009 to take effect 1 August 2010. The agreement will reduce or eliminate tariffs on thousands of industrial and agricultural products. The two countries have also agreed to reciprocate most-favoured nation status in private education, engineering services, environmental protection, mining services and information technology.

Myanmar
In a protest rally in December 2016, Najib criticized the Myanmar authorities for the military crackdown on Rohingya Muslims, and described the ongoing persecution as "genocide".

Philippines and the Moro people of Mindanao

 
The Moro Islamic Liberation Front has always favoured Malaysia as a mediator in their effort of becoming an autonomous state. On 15 October 2012, the Moro rebel and the Philippines authority has devised a peace agreement to maintain the safety and security of the nation. Malaysia plays an important part in making this particular notion to be accepted by both parties. During the official ceremony of signing the agreement, the Malaysian government was invited as a witness to the long due treaty. Malaysia plays an important part, not just as a mediator but also as a confidante for both the Philippines government and also the rebel.

LCS scandal 
Najib has been implicated in the misappropriation of funds in the purchase of littoral combat ships (LCS). There is a perception that Najib was "the most powerful decision-maker" in the LCS procurement arrangements as he was both prime minister and finance minister at the time (April 2009). In 2022, Najib commented that the project was given to contractor Boustead Naval Shipyard Sdn Bhd because it was owned by the Armed Forces Fund Board (LTAT) and all profits of the project would thus go to the armed forces.

14th Malaysian general election 
Malaysia held its 14th general election in May 2018. Barisan Nasional was dealt a surprising defeat, failing to win a majority for the first time in the country's history. Observers credited the unpopular Goods and Services Tax as well as the swirling 1MDB corruption scandal as key factors in the defeat. On 12 May 2018, Najib resigned as President of UMNO and Chairman of BN and was replaced by UMNO vice-president, Hishammuddin Hussein.

Post-premiership 
Najib accepted the defeat and pledged to facilitate a smooth transfer of power. On 12 May 2018, three days after he lost the general elections, a flight manifest stated that Najib and his wife, Rosmah were taking a private jet to Halim Perdanakusuma International Airport in Jakarta. In response, the Immigration Department, upon the orders of Prime Minister Mahathir Mohamad, imposed a travel ban barring their exit from the country. Amidst the country's mood turning against him, Najib resigned as the leader of UMNO and Barisan Nasional on the same day.

The newly elected Pakatan Harapan government swiftly reopened investigations into the 1MDB scandal. Since 16 May 2018, the Malaysian police have searched six properties linked to Najib and Rosmah as part of the investigation into the 1MDB scandal. They have seized 284 boxes filled with designer handbags, 72 large luggage bags containing cash in multiple currencies, and other valuables. The Malaysian police commissioner confirmed that the police seized goods with an estimated value of between US$223 and US$273 million. The police described it as the biggest seizure in Malaysian history.

In January 2019, a 7-second video clip of Najib uttered "Malu Apa Bossku" ( "What's there to be ashamed of my boss") went viral on the internet. Najib later released a picture of him posed on a Yamaha Y150 motorcycle with the registration plate 8055KU (BOSSKU). The catchphrase and the picture went viral on social media, especially with Malay youths, and inspired videos, memes, t-shirts, caps, vehicle stickers and a music video. The phenomenon has contributed to Najib's rise in popularity. Najib also claimed that his "Bossku" phenomenon has contributed to a victory for his party in 2020 Kimanis by-election.

COVID-19 measure violations 
On 6 May 2021 amid the COVID-19 pandemic in Malaysia, Najib was given two fines amounting to RM3,000 for failing to comply with standard operating procedures (SOPs) of the conditional movement control order (CMCO) at a chicken rice restaurant. On 11 January 2022, the police opened an investigation into an event attended by Najib over claims that there was a breach of Covid-19 SOPs.

On 27 February 2022, Health Minister Khairy Jamaluddin said he will review a video depicting Najib purportedly violating Covid-19 SOPs during a campaign visit in Perling, Johor. On 10 March 2022, Health Minister Khairy Jamaluddin revealed that his ministry had issued 42 compound notices for the violation of SOPs during the campaign period for the Johor election, including five to Najib.

Controversies and issues

Murder of Altantuya

Mongolian model Altantuya Shaariibuu disappeared outside the house of Abdul Razak Baginda, formerly a close associate of Najib, on October 19, 2006. She was never seen alive again. Three weeks later, her remains were found in a forest in Selangor. In 2008, Abdul Razak was acquitted by the High Court of abetment in the murder of Altantuyaa. In 2015, Chief Inspector Azilah Hadri and Corporal Sirul Azhar Umar were found guilty of her murder and sentenced to death. 
 
In 2007, a Mongolian witness caused a stir in court when she revealed that Altantuya had been photographed having a meal with a Malaysian government official named 'Najib'. Detective P. Balasubramaniam also linked Najib to Altantuya in a statutory declaration (SD) on July 3, 2008. Najib has repeatedly denied knowing Altantuya or that he had any part in her death.

1Malaysia Development Berhad scandal 

On 2 July 2015, The Wall Street Journal ran an exposé alleging that MYR 2.672 billion (US$700 million) had been channelled from 1MDB into Najib's personal bank accounts, triggering widespread calls for his resignation. Najib denied any wrongdoing and announced plans to sue the newspaper for libel but eventually failed to do so. On 6 July 2015, amid the 1MDB scandal, the ringgit fell to 3.8050 against the US dollar, the first time it slid beyond the 3.80 currency peg, which was lifted in 2005. To back up the allegations, on 7 July 2015, The Wall Street Journal released a batch of partially redacted documents that purportedly show how nearly US$700 million (RM2.6 billion) was moved from 1MDB into Najib's personal bank accounts. These documents relate to transactions in March 2013, December 2014 and February 2015.

The multi-agency task force investigating these allegations reported on 10 July 2015 that Najib's bank accounts at AmBank Islamic were closed before The Wall Street Journal reported the transfers of billions of ringgit to those accounts, thereby confirming that Najib had two accounts at that bank. The task force also confirmed that the six accounts it had just frozen did not belong to Najib but did not name the holders of those accounts Najib's handling of the corruption scandal was criticised by, among others, former Prime Minister Mahathir Mohamad and then Deputy Prime Minister Muhyiddin Yassin. During Najib's mid-term Cabinet reshuffle on 28 July 2015, Najib dropped Muhyiddin from his position as Deputy Prime Minister, as well as other Ministers who had been critical of his leadership. Najib stated that the reason for this was to create a more "unified team".

On 1 August 2015, Najib addressed UMNO delegates in Seremban and in a clear reference to the Sarawak Report, the London-based whistleblower site founded and operated by journalist Clare Rewcastle Brown, demanded that "white people" stay out of Malaysia's affairs and stressed that he valued loyalty above all, and not smart people.

On 3 August 2015, the Malaysian Anti-Corruption Commission stated that the RM 2.6 billion that had been banked into Najib's personal account came from donors, not 1MDB, but did not elaborate on who the donors were or why the funds were transferred, nor why this explanation had taken so long to emerge since the allegations were first made on 2 July 2015. Umno Kuantan division chief Wan Adnan Wan Mamat later claimed that the RM 2.6 billion was from Saudi Arabia as thanks for fighting ISIS. He further claimed that the Muslim community in the Philippines as well as southern Thailand had also received similar donations, and that since the donations were made to Najib personally as opposed to UMNO, the funds were deposited into Najib's personal accounts.

The scandal took a dramatic twist on 28 August 2015 when a member of Najib's own party, Anina Saaduddin, UMNO's Langkawi Wanita (women's) representative, filed a civil suit against him alleging a breach of duties as trustee and that he defrauded party members by failing to disclose receipt of the donated funds, and account for their use.  This suit was filed in the Kuala Lumpur High Court and also named party Executive Secretary Abdul Rauf Yusof. Expressing fear that Najib would wield influence to remove any member of UMNO "for the sole purpose of avoiding liability" the court was also petitioned for an injunction to restrain UMNO, its Supreme Council, state liaison body, divisions and branches from removing the nominal plaintiff as a party member pending the determination of the suit. The plaintiff also sought repayment amounting to US$650 million, the amount allegedly deposited by Najib to a Singapore bank, an account of all monies that he had received in the form of donations, details of all monies in the AmPrivate Banking Account No 2112022009694 allegedly belonging to Najib, along with damages, costs, and other reliefs.

On 21 September 2015, the New York Times reported that US investigators were investigating allegations of corruption involving Najib as well as people close to him. In particular, investigators focused on properties in the United States that were purchased in recent years by shell companies owned by Najib's stepson Riza Aziz or connected to a close family friend, as well as a $681 million payment made to what is believed to be Najib's personal bank account.

The claimed MYR 2.6 billion "donation" into Najib's personal accounts led the opposition to table a no-confidence motion against Najib, on 18 October 2015.

On 26 January 2016, Malaysia's Attorney General Mohamed Apandi Ali announced that the investigation into the $681 million payment into Najib's personal bank account had been closed. The Anti-Corruption Commission investigating the gift, led by Apandi, concluded that no laws had been broken and that the gift did not amount to graft. Apandi was appointed attorney general by Najib in August 2015 after the previous attorney general, Abdul Gani Patail, was abruptly dismissed by Najib. Although Bernama, Malaysia's state-run news service, reported that Abdul Gani was removed for health reasons, many speculated that his dismissal was related to the 1MDB corruption investigation. The Attorney General then said that the [Saudi Royal Family] was the source of the $681 million gift, although doubts remained as the Saudi ministries of foreign affairs and finance had no information on the purported gift.

Najib was reported to have returned $620 million to the Saudi royal family in 2013, but no explanation was given as to the reason for the investment or what happened to the $61 million Najib did not return. Najib hailed the results of the investigation and reiterated his denial of any wrongdoing.

On 28 March 2016, the Australian television programme Four Corners in an episode called State of Fear: Murder and Money in Malaysia, aired new allegations about the large sums of money that have flowed into the bank accounts of Najib Razak.

On 30 March 2016, the Wall Street Journal, Time and several other news agencies reported that Prime Minister Najib Razak and his wife, Rosmah Mansor had spent $15 million on luxury goods and extravagant travel expenses. During Najib Razak's golf diplomacy with U.S. President Barack Obama on 24 December 2014, Malaysian investigation documents show that Rosmah Mansor had purchased items amounting to $130,625 at a Chanel store in Honolulu, Hawaii. The allegation was confirmed when a store employee at the Chanel store in the upscale Ala Moana Center recalled Najib's wife shopping there just before 25 December 2014.

In April 2016, Mohd Nazifuddin Najib, the son of Najib, has been named in the Panama Papers.

In July 2016, the United States Department of Justice launched a civil lawsuit to seize American assets worth over US$1 billion (4.1 billion MYR) allegedly obtained from US$3.5 billion (14.38 billion MYR) of misappropriated 1MDB funds. Within the civil lawsuit, a government official of high rank who had control over 1MDB was referred to as "Malaysian Official 1", and mentioned over 30 times. "Malaysian Official 1" was alleged to have received around US$681 million (2.797 billion MYR) of stolen 1MDB money via Falcon Bank, Singapore on 21 and 25 March 2013, of which US$650 million (2.0 billion MYR) was sent back to Falcon Bank on 30 August 2013. In September 2016, Najib was identified as "Malaysian Official 1" by Datuk Abdul Rahman Dahlan, Minister in the Prime Minister's Department and the Barisan Nasional strategic communications director. Dahlan also claimed that Najib was not named because he was "not part of this investigation".

On 15 June 2017, The United States Department of Justice followed up on its July 2016 lawsuit by issuing a civil action in rem to forfeit assets involved in and traceable to an international conspiracy to launder money misappropriated from 1Malaysia Development Berhad ("a strategic investment and development company wholly-owned by the government of Malaysia"). The writ provided detailed justifications for seeing to forfeit specific items and property located in the United States and abroad, including in the United Kingdom and Switzerland.

As a consequence of the 15 June 2017 writ, on 28 February 2018 Indonesian authorities seized the luxury yacht linked to the 1MDB investigations in waters off Bali, on behalf of the FBI. Additionally, on 7 March 2018 in Californian courts, the producers of the 'Wolf of Wall Street' film agreed to pay $60m to settle Justice Department claims it financed the movie with money siphoned from 1MDB.

In a speech in December 2017, US attorney general Jeff Sessions said of the scandal: "This is kleptocracy at its worst."

Subsequent arrest, legal proceedings and conviction 

On 3 July 2018 after the 14th Malaysian general election, Najib was arrested by the Malaysian Anti-Corruption Commission (MACC) as part of investigations into how RM42 million (US$10.6 million) went from SRC International into Najib's bank account. The following day, Najib was indicted in the High Court in Kuala Lumpur on three counts of criminal breach of trust and one count of abuse of power in connection with SRC International funds totalling RM42 million. He was granted bail at RM1 million after pleading not guilty with his trial set for 18 February 2019.

On 8 August 2018, Najib was charged with three further counts of money laundering as part of the MACC's investigation into the 1MDB scandal. Najib has denied making three transfers totaling RM42 from SRC International into his bank accounts.

On 10 September 2018, Najib posted a copy of the letter that purportedly came from Prince Saud Abdulaziz Al-Saud of Saudi Arabia on his Facebook account, as a proof of the alleged financial donation of US$100mil (RM304.5mil) given to him in 2011. He said he decided to reveal the documents in a bid to clear his name of various accusations and slander, and would continue to do so on his social media accounts.

On 19 September 2018, Najib was arrested following two hours of questioning by the MACC, believed to be in relation to the RM2.6 billion donation he received in year 2013. Najib was charged on 20 September 2018 at the Sessions Court in Jalan Duta. However, he pleaded not guilty and was released on bail after his court appearance. On 21 September, he made a brief appearance at the Sessions Court registry to sign his bail at RM3.5 million for 25 counts of money laundering and abuse of power charges in relation to 1MDB. He has posted RM1 million for his bail, while the remaining RM2.5 million will be settled in instalments by the following week. In August 2019, during his second trial, Najib faces four charges of abuse of power and 21 charges of money laundering for receiving illegal transfers of RM 2.3 billion between 2011 and 2014.

On 28 July 2020, the High Court convicted Najib guilty on all seven counts of abuse of power, money laundering and criminal breach of trust in relation to the SRC International case, becoming the first Prime Minister of Malaysia to be convicted of corruption.
High Court judge Mohamad Nazlan bin Mohamad Ghazali has delivered the verdict regarding the misappropriation of RM42 million (US$10 million) from SRC International, a former subsidiary of 1MDB. In total, Najib faces 42 charges, of which 35 in another four trials are yet to be decided on.

On the day of his conviction, Najib was sentenced to 12 years' imprisonment and a fine of RM210 million (for the first charge). He was also given six concurrent sentences of 10 years' imprisonment for the other six charges. If he fails to pay the fine, he will be serving another five years in prison. He would be appealing against the verdict of the High Court. The High Court granted a stay of execution of the conviction with an increased bail of RM 2 million with reporting to the police on the first and the fifth day of every month.

Appeal 
Najib's appeal hearing in front of the Court of Appeal of Malaysia began on 5 April 2021.  On 8 December 2021, the Court of Appeal of Malaysia dismissed Najib's appeal, therefore upholding both his conviction and 12-year sentence. Judge Abdul Karim Abdul Jalil has also condemned Najib's actions as a "national embarrassment". Najib's lawyer stated that his client, who remained outside prison on bail, would further appeal to the Federal Court of Malaysia against his conviction and sentence. On 16 August 2022, Malaysia’s supreme court rejected Najib’s appeal for a retrial, stating that the case had no evidence of bias. The Federal Court indicated that it would hear a final appeal by Razak in the SRC corruption case from 18 August 2022.

On 23 August 2022, when the Federal Court was finishing hearing the appeal, Najib's counsel made an application to recuse the Chief Justice Tengku Maimun. This application was dismissed and the Federal Court upheld the Court of Appeal's conviction, handing down its full judgment here. Upon the dissolution of Parliament on 10 October 2022, Najib automatically vacated his Pekan parliamentary seat, and as he has been convicted of a crime, he is no longer eligible to stand in general elections.

Najib is the first Malaysian former prime minister to be convicted and jailed for corruption. Rumours that he would receive special treatment during his sentence were denied by officials.

Personal life

In 1976, Najib married Tengku Puteri Zainah Tengku Eskandar ('Kui Yie') with whom he has three children: Mohd Nizar Najib (born 1978), Mohd Nazifuddin Najib and Puteri Norlisa Najib. Nizar is currently a Member of the Pahang State Legislative Assembly (MLA) for Peramu Jaya, winning the seat in the 2022 Pahang state election. 

In 1987, he divorced Kui Yie and married Datin Seri Rosmah Mansor with whom he has two children: Mohd Norashman Najib and Nooryana Najwa Najib. His daughter Nooryana is married to the nephew of former Kazakhstani President, Nursultan Nazarbayev.

Najib Razak was an avid golf lover and he was known to have played golf with the two U.S. Presidents – Barack Obama and Donald Trump. Trump has referred to Najib as "my favourite prime minister".

Najib Razak has four long-haired cats, named Kiki, Leo, Tiger and Simba.

Election results

Honours

Honours of Malaysia
  :
  Knight Companion of the Order of Sultan Ahmad Shah of Pahang (DSAP) – Dato'
  Grand Knight of the Order of the Crown of Pahang (SIMP) – formerly Dato', now Dato' Indera
  Grand Knight of the Order of Sultan Ahmad Shah of Pahang (SSAP) – Dato' Sri (1985)
  Member 2nd class of the Family Order of the Crown of Indra of Pahang (DK II) (2010)
  :
  Knight Commander of the Most Exalted Order of the Star of Sarawak (PNBS) – Dato Sri (1990)
  Knight Grand Commander of the Order of the Star of Hornbill Sarawak (DP) – Datuk Patinggi (2008)
  :
  Grand Commander of the Order of Kinabalu (SPDK) – Datuk Seri Panglima (2002)
  :
  (1992, suspended 6 May 2019, revoked 12 September 2022)
  (2004, suspended 6 May 2019, revoked 12 September 2022)
  :
  Ordinary Class of the Perak Family Order of Sultan Azlan Shah (SPSA) – Dato' Seri Diraja (2004)
  :
  Knight Grand Commander of the Order of the Crown of Kelantan (SPMK) – Dato' (2004)
  :
  (2005, revoked 26 October 2018)
  :
  Knight Grand Companion of the Order of the Gallant Prince Syed Sirajuddin Jamalullail (SSSJ) – Dato' Seri Diraja (2007)
  :
  Knight Grand Commander of the Premier and Exalted Order of Malacca (DUNM) – Datuk Seri Utama (2007)
  :
  Member of the Supreme Order of Sri Mahawangsa (DMK) – Dato' Seri Utama (2008)
  :
  Knight Grand Commander of the Order of the Defender of State (DUPN) - Dato' Seri Utama (2009, revoked 15 September 2022)

Foreign honours
  :
 King Hamad Order for Development  – (2017)
 King Hamad (Al Nahda) First Medal – (2017)
  :
  Family Order of Brunei 1st Class (DK) – Dato Laila Utama (2010)
  :
  Member 1st Class of the Order of Abdulaziz al Saud – (2010)
  :
 Order of the Union Medal  – (2014)

Honorary degrees
  :
 Honorary Ph.D. degree in Social Transformation from Limkokwing University (2008)
 Honorary Ph.D. degree from Monash University (2011)
  :
 Honorary Ph.D. degree from Meiji University (2010)
  :
 Honorary Ph.D. degree from al-Aqsa University (2013)

Other 
On 1 February 2016, FinanceAsia has named Najib as the worst finance minister in 2016. The magazine said that 2015 had been a challenging year for the Malaysian economy, with a "double whammy" of the 1MDB scandal and the collapse in oil prices.

See also
 Najib Razak controversies
 1Malaysia Development Berhad scandal
 Corruption in Malaysia
 Kleptocracy
 The Kleptocrats
 Murder of Shaariibuugiin Altantuyaa
 Unexplained wealth of the Marcos family

Notes

References

External links

  (Archived at the Wayback Machine)

|-

|-

|-

|-

|-

|-

|-

|-

|-

|-

|-

|-

1953 births
Living people
People from Pahang
Malaysian people of Bugis descent
Malaysian people of Malay descent
Malaysian Muslims
Children of prime ministers of Malaysia
Presidents of United Malays National Organisation
Members of the Dewan Rakyat
Prime Ministers of Malaysia
Deputy Prime Ministers of Malaysia
Malaysian Leaders of the Opposition
Government ministers of Malaysia
Defence ministers of Malaysia
Education ministers of Malaysia
Finance ministers of Malaysia
Chief Ministers of Pahang
Pahang state executive councillors
Members of the Pahang State Legislative Assembly
People educated at Malvern College
Alumni of the University of Nottingham
Second Classes of the Family Order of the Crown of Indra of Pahang
Grand Commanders of the Order of Kinabalu
Knights Commander of the Most Exalted Order of the Star of Sarawak
Knights Grand Commander of the Order of the Star of Hornbill Sarawak
Malaysian politicians convicted of crimes
20th-century Malaysian politicians
21st-century Malaysian politicians
Money launderers
People convicted of money laundering
Malaysian politicians convicted of corruption